The 2021–22 Utah Valley Wolverines men's basketball team represented Utah Valley University in the 2021–22 NCAA Division I men's basketball season. The Wolverines, led by third-year head coach Mark Madsen, played their home games at the UCCU Center in Orem, Utah, and compete as members of the Western Athletic Conference (WAC).

Previous season

Roster

Schedule and results

|-
!colspan=12 style=| Non-conference regular season

|-
!colspan=12 style=| WAC regular season

|-
!colspan=9 style=|WAC tournament

|-

Sources:

See also
 2021–22 Utah Valley Wolverines women's basketball team

References

Utah Valley Wolverines men's basketball seasons
Utah Valley Wolverines
Utah Valley Wolverines men's basketball
Utah Valley Wolverines men's basketball